Rabbi Nachum Shifren (born  1951), also known as the "Surfing Rabbi," is an Orthodox Lubavitcher Chassidic rabbi and accomplished surfer. Active in far-right nationalist politics, Shifren was the candidate in 2010 of the California Republican Party in the California State Senate's 26th district.

Biography

A native of southern California, Shifren grew up in the San Fernando Valley, where he learned to surf as a youth. He worked as a lifeguard in Malibu as a young man, a time in his life when he was not religious. He began his path to religiosity when he met an Australian rabbi who liked to bodysurf and performed sacraments at the beach. At the outbreak of the Yom Kippur War, Shifren went to Israel to volunteer on a kibbutz, and in 1977 he emigrated to Israel. Shifren served in the Israeli Defense Forces as a combat fitness instructor and received a degree in Combat Fitness Training at the Wingate Institute for Sports in Netanya, Israel.

Shifren received a Bachelor of Arts degree from the University of California of Santa Barbara in Spanish and German Literature. He continued graduate studies in West Germany at the University of Göttingen. Shifren is fluent in English, Spanish, German, Hebrew, and Yiddish. He attended Toras Chayim Yeshiva in Jerusalem and Yeshivat Tomchei Tmimim in Kfar Chabad, Israel, where in 1990 he was ordained to the rabbinate. While studying in Israel, Shifren lived in Kfar Tapuah.

When he returned to the United States, Shifren worked as a teacher in Los Angeles.

He is affiliated with Chabad. He has no formal connection with the organization.

Politics

Rabbi Shifren has been described as a counter-jihadist, and has links with similar groups in Europe, notably the English Defence League (EDL). He traveled to England in December 2010 to support an EDL demonstration, which protested against Islamic fundamentalism.

In October, 2010, he traveled to England to speak at an EDL rally. In his speech, he said that "[h]istory will be recorded that on this day, read by our children for eternity, one group lit the spark to liberate us from the oppressors of our two governments and the leftist, fifth column, quisling press, and that it was the EDL which started the liberation of England from evil."

Also in 2010, Shifren penned an article that referred to student protesters as "the front line of an army of Muslims that is waiting patiently to take over and subvert our country," called the students "terrorists-in-training" and announced "we are at war with radical Islam."

In November 2017, Shifren led a group that spoke out at a San Diego City Council meeting against the racism of Chicano Park and the supposed refusal of the local residents to allow everyone equal access to this municipal park. He denounced the views of the La Raza movement, comparing it to Nazi ideology.

In March 1993, Shifren created turmoil at a conference of rabbis attended by Rev. Jesse Jackson. Shifren shouted out to Jackson, "If you were white, you would be considered a Nazi!", in reference to comments the Reverend delivered  which had been considered by members of the Jewish community to be antisemitic. It then took five rabbis to remove Shifren from the convention.

Public image

Numerous print and broadcast media have done stories about Shifren and his "Surfing Rabbi" persona. He founded Jewish Surfers International and the Surf & Soul newsletter. He frequently uses surfing imagery to make religious points. "There's no way a skier can get the same connection with the Creator," Shifren told Salon in 1999. "The ocean is the first act of creation, while snow is not an act of creation. Skiers don't have the mountain chasing them, but the mountain of a wave chases surfers. They struggle against currents as they ride waves that have been around since time immemorial."

He leads annual "Kosher Surf Camp" trips to Costa Rica. He has written two books, Surfing Rabbi: A Kabbalistic Quest for Soul and Kill Your Teacher: Corruption And Racism in Los Angeles City Schools.

References

External links 
 Rabbi Shifren's state senate campaign 
 a video with an interview of Shifren

Living people
1950s births
American Orthodox rabbis
American surfers
American Zionists
California Republicans
Counter-jihad activists
American critics of Islam
University of California, Santa Barbara alumni
University of Göttingen alumni
American religious writers
Wingate Institute alumni
Jewish American people in California politics
Yiddish-speaking people
21st-century American Jews